Sir John Peter Boileau, 1st Baronet FRS, DL, JP (2 September 1794 – 9 March 1869) was a British baronet and archaeologist.

Background
Born in Hertford Street in London's district Mayfair, he was the eldest son of John Peter Boileau and his wife Henrietta, the eldest daughter of John Pollen. His family claimed descendancy of Étienne Boileau, one of the first known provosts of Paris. He was educated at Eton College and went then to Merton College, Oxford. In 1813, Boileau joined the British Army and was commissioned as 2nd lieutenant into the Rifle Corps, which his uncle Coote Manningham had established. After four years service, he was put on halfpay in 1817. He bought an estate in Ketteringham in 1836, which he later expanded with a Gothic hall.

Career
In 1838, Boileau was created a baronet, of Tacolnestone Hall, in the County of Norfolk. He was elected a fellow of the Royal Society in 1843 and was appointed High Sheriff of Norfolk in 1844. When one year later the Norfolk and Norwich Archaeological Society was founded, Boileau was nominated one of its vice-presidents until 1849, after which he became the Society's president. He joined the Society of Antiquaries of London in 1852 and by the recommendation of Philip Stanhope, 5th Earl Stanhope, he was chosen a vice-president in 1858, a post he occupied for seven years with only a break in 1863. Boileau was additionally vice-president of the Zoological Society of London and of the Royal Statistical Society. He served in the same capacity for the Institute of Archaeology and for the Royal Society of Arts. Boileau further held a fellowship in the Geological Society of London and was vice-president of the Royal Institution as well as the British Science Association. He represented Norfolk both as a deputy lieutenant as well as a justice of the peace.

Family

In 1825, he married Catherine Sarah, the third daughter of Gilbert Elliot-Murray-Kynynmound, 1st Earl of Minto. They had four sons and five daughters. His wife died in 1862 and Boileau survived her until 1869, having suffered on chronic bronchitis in his last years. He died at Torquay and was buried in the family's vault in Ketteringham. His oldest son John having predeceased him in 1861, he was succeeded in the baronetcy by his second son Francis.

Their children were:

Anna Maria (11 Aug. 1826-21 Nov. 1897), married Rev. William Gurney, son of Daniel Gurney and Harriett, daughter of William Hay, 17th Earl of Erroll. They had issue. 
John Elliot (28 Sep. 1827-8 Oct. 1861). Unmarried.
Caroline Mary (c. 1829-2 Apr. 1877). Unmarried.
Sir Francis George, 2nd Baronet 
Edmund William Pollen (8 Aug. 1831-9 Jul. 1883), married Bridget Walsh and had issue.
Agnes Lucy (c. 1833-30 Sep. 1881), married Hon. William John Borlase Warren Venables-Vernon, son of George Venables-Vernon, 5th Baron Vernon. They had one son, Reginald.
Lt. Charles Augustus Penrhyn (9 Aug. 1835-1 Aug. 1855) 
Mary Georgina (23 Nov. 1836-2 Oct. 1910). Unmarried.
Theressa Anna Catherine (c. 1840-1 Jul 1872). Unmarried.

References

External links

1794 births
1869 deaths
19th-century British archaeologists
Alumni of Merton College, Oxford
Baronets in the Baronetage of the United Kingdom
Deputy Lieutenants of Norfolk
High Sheriffs of Norfolk
Fellows of the Geological Society of London
Fellows of the Royal Society
Fellows of the Society of Antiquaries of London
Fellows of the Zoological Society of London
People educated at Eton College
Rifle Brigade officers
People from Mayfair
People from South Norfolk (district)
People from Broadland (district)